Vice Admiral Giuseppe Lertora (March 19, 1946, Riccò del Golfo) is a retired Italian naval officer who served as Commander in Chief Naval Fleet from 2006 to 2009.

References

Italian admirals
Living people
1946 births